This is a list of members of the 17th Legislative Assembly of Queensland from February 1908 to October 1909, as elected at the 1908 state election held on 5 February 1908.

The Philp Ministry did not command a majority on the floor of the Assembly during its short term of government, and the Assembly was dissolved, resulting in gains for both the Kidstonites and Labour, and the return of William Kidston as Premier. However, in late 1908, the two non-Labour parties merged into a new grouping known as the Liberals, also sometimes identified as the Ministerial party (a generic form referring to supporters of the Ministry). As not all members of the original parties supported the new Government, Kidston called another election — the third in 29 months — for 2 October 1909.

  On 20 January 1909, John Leahy, the Liberal member for Bulloo, died. Labour candidate Frank Allen won the resulting by-election on 27 March 1909.
  On 27 May 1909, John Dunmore Campbell, the Liberal member for Moreton, died. Liberal candidate James Forsyth won the resulting by-election on 19 June 1909.

See also
1908 Queensland state election
Second Kidston Ministry (Kidston/Liberal) (1908–1911)

References

 Waterson, Duncan Bruce: Biographical Register of the Queensland Parliament 1860-1929 (second edition), Sydney 2001.
 
 

Members of Queensland parliaments by term
20th-century Australian politicians